This was the first edition of the tournament. It was originally supposed to be held in 2020 but was canceled due to the COVID-19 pandemic.

Íñigo Cervantes and Oriol Roca Batalla won the title after defeating Thiago Agustín Tirante and Juan Bautista Torres 6–1, 6–2 in the final.

Seeds

Draw

References

External links
 Main draw

Internationaux de Tennis de Troyes - Doubles